Forst (Lausitz) (Lower Sorbian: Baršć (Łužyca)) is a town in Lower Lusatia, Brandenburg, Germany. It lies east of Cottbus, on the river Lausitzer Neiße which is also the German-Polish border, the Oder-Neisse line. It is the capital of the Spree-Neiße district. It is known for its rose garden and textile museum. The town's population is 18,651. In Forst, there is a railway bridge across the Neiße belonging to the line Cottbus–Żary which is serviced by regional trains and a EuroCity train between Hamburg and Kraków (2011). There is also a road bridge across the river north of Forst.

Overview 
Part of the region of Lower Lusatia, Forst was awarded to the Kingdom of Prussia in the 1815 Congress of Vienna. The town was administered as a part of the Province of Brandenburg from 1815 to 1947. After World War II it became part of the German Democratic Republic, from 1952 to 1990 within Bezirk Cottbus.

Forst has experienced severe problems as a result of the 1990 German reunification, most notably from extreme unemployment. In the past, the town was known for textile manufacturing, but all of the textile plants and factories have closed down.

Incorporated villages 

 Forst (Lausitz) – Baršć (Łužyca)
 Domsdorf – Domašojce
 Eigene Scholle – Swójske Grunty
 Eulo – Wiłow
 Försterei Keune – Gólnikaŕnja Chójna
 Keune – Chójna
 Mexiko
 Noßdorf – Nosydłojce
 Bohrau – Bórow
 Briesnig – Rjasnik
 Groß Bademeusel – Wjelike Bóžemysle
 Groß Jamno – Jamne
 Horno – Rogow
 Klein Bademeusel – Małe Bóžemysle
 Försterei Bademeusel – Bóžemyslańska Gólnikaŕnja
 Klein Jamno – Małe Jamne
 Mulknitz – Małksa
 Naundorf – Glinsk
 Neu Sacro – Nowy Zakrjow
 Sacro – Zakrjow

History 
A short distance to the south of the old Sorbian village of Altforst, the town probably originated around 1150 at a river crossing point on the important west–east route (known as the Salzstraße / Salt Road) connecting Halle and Głogów. By 1265 it was developing into a permanent trading settlement round the Church of St Nicholas.   The commercial importance of Forst increased with the development of a north–south route connecting to Guben, downstream along the Neisse River.   In the fourteenth century the council was able to take on responsibility for the lower courts locally.   In 1352 of Ileburg took over the overlordship of Forst from Frederick III of Meißen.

Demography

Notable people  
 Hugo Baum (1867–1950), botanist
 Georg Thomas (1890–1946), general of infantry
 Bruno Kastner (1890–1932), film and stage actor
 Max Seydewitz (1892–1987), politician (SPD, SED)
 Brigitte Frank, née Herbst (1895–1959), wife of Hans Frank
 Erich Neumann (1892–1948), politician (NSDAP)
 Werner Heyde (1902–1964), psychiatrist, involved in the T 4 program
 Georg Bose (1921–2011), German officer during World War II
 Günter Nooke (born 1959), politician (CDU)
 Dietmar Woidke (born 1961), politician (SPD)
 René Rydlewicz (born 1973), footballer
 Ronny Scholz (born 1978), cyclist

See also
Bohrau

References

External links 
 
 Official website of Forst (Lausitz) 
 Forst's Rose Garden 
 
 

 
Populated places in Spree-Neiße
Germany–Poland border crossings
Divided cities